Daniel Burka (born December 17, 1978 in Canada) is best known as the former creative director for website Digg and as a design partner at GV.  He is also a founding partner at the web design company silverorange based in Charlottetown, Prince Edward Island, Canada.

At silverorange Burka worked with Mozilla on the original Firefox brand as part of a team including Jon Hicks called the Mozilla Visual Identity Team. The same team developed the Thunderbird identity and the Mozilla website.

Burka joined Kevin Rose's company Digg in 2005 and served as head of design for 5 years. In January 2008, Burka co-founded the social networking service Pownce. Pownce was acquired by Six Apart on December 1, 2008 and the site was shut down on December 15, 2008 due to stagnant growth and lack of revenue. In September 2009, Burka announced that he was leaving Digg to join the gaming startup Tiny Speck, started by Flickr co-founder Stewart Butterfield. In April 2011, Burka announced that he was leaving Tiny Speck to join as co-founder of Milk with Kevin Rose and Jeff Hodsdon.

In March 2012 Kevin Rose posted that the Milk team (Daniel Burka, Chris Hutchins, Joshua Lane, and Kevin Rose) was joining Google. Burka was a design partner at GV for 5 years. At GV, Burka contributed to the book called Sprint about the design sprint process, authored by Jake Knapp.

Burka is currently the director of product and design at Tom Frieden's not-for-profit organization Resolve to Save Lives where he works on the Simple.org project. The goal of Resolve to Save Lives is to save 100 million lives from cardiovascular disease by catalyzing evidence-based measures in public health programs.

References

External links
Daniel Burka's website
Podcast Interview with Daniel Burka 2021

1978 births
Living people